Durant House may refer to:

Durant House (St. Charles, Illinois), listed on the National Register of Historic Places in Kane County, Illinois
Capt. Edward Durant House, Newton, Massachusetts

See also

 
Durant Hall, Berkeley, California, listed on the National Register of Historic Places in Alameda County, California
 Durant (disambiguation)
 House (disambiguation)